8 Camelopardalis is a star in the northern circumpolar constellation of Camelopardalis. It is a challenge to view with the naked eye, appearing as a dim, orange-hued star with an apparent visual magnitude of 6.09. Based upon parallax, it is located around 750 light years away from the Sun. At that distance, the visual magnitude is diminished by an extinction of 0.58 due to interstellar dust.

This is an aging K-type giant star with a stellar classification of K4 III, which indicates it has exhausted the hydrogen at its core and evolved away from the main sequence. The star has expanded to 30 times the radius of the Sun and is radiating 341 times the Sun's luminosity from its enlarged photosphere at an effective temperature of 4,257 K.

References

K-type giants
Camelopardalis (constellation)
Durchmusterung objects
Camelopardalis, 08
031579
023216
1588